Stangvik is a village in Surnadal Municipality in Møre og Romsdal county, Norway. The village is home to Stangvik Church. County Road 321 runs through the village, along the coast of the fjord.

Historically, the village was the administrative centre of the old Stangvik Municipality from 1838 until its dissolution in 1965.

References

Villages in Møre og Romsdal
Surnadal